Dunkin' Brands Group, Inc. was an American restaurant holding company which ran three chains of fast-food restaurants: Dunkin' Donuts, Mister Donut, and Baskin-Robbins. It was headquartered in Canton, Massachusetts.

History

Allied-Lyons
In 1973, British food company J. Lyons and Co. purchased Baskin-Robbins from United Brands. J. Lyons and Co. then merged with Allied Breweries, becoming Allied-Lyons in 1978. In 1990, Allied-Lyons acquired Dunkin' Donuts and Mister Donut.

Allied Quick Service Restaurants
In 1994, Allied-Lyons merged with Pedro Domecq S.A., becoming Allied Domecq. The restaurant operations were merged under a subsidiary named Allied Domecq Quick Service Restaurants. In 1997, Togo's was acquired by Allied Domecq.

Dunkin' Brands

In 2004, Allied Domecq Quick Service Restaurants was renamed "Dunkin' Brands, Inc.". On December 12, 2005, Pernod Ricard, which had just taken control of Allied Domecq, announced the sale of Dunkin' Brands to a consortium of private equity firms consisting of Bain Capital, The Carlyle Group and Thomas H. Lee Partners for $2.425 billion in cash. Dunkin' Brands, Inc. was renamed "Dunkin' Brands Group, Inc." after the transaction.

On November 30, 2007, Dunkin' Brands sold Togo's to Mainsail Partners, a San Francisco-based private equity firm, in partnership with Tony Gioia, a former president of Baskin-Robbins.

In July 2011, Dunkin' Brands completed its initial public offering and became listed on the NASDAQ Global Select Market (NASDAQ-GS large cap) under the symbol "DNKN".

In August 2012, Dunkin' Brands became completely independent of the private equity firms.

In October 2017, Dunkin' Brands announced the company would be investing $100 million in United States locations of Dunkin’ Donuts’. The company also said they are considering a name change to the shortened Dunkin'. The name change is being tested in a California location and a new store in Quincy, Massachusetts.

On July 30, 2020 the organization announced it would permanently close 800 of its donut and coffee shops by the end of the year due to a sales slump caused by the coronavirus pandemic, primarily locations inside convenience stores, namely Speedway.

Dunkin' Brands reported in October 2020 that negotiations were being held with the private equity-backed company Inspire Brands for Inspire to acquire the company. The potential deal includes Dunkin' Brands private stocks would be sold at $106.50 a share, a 20 percent premium over the closing prices reported on the 23rd of October, implying that the company is being evaluated at around $8.8 billion. A statement released by Dunkin' claimed that "there is no certainty that any agreement will be reached" as well that no further comments will be released until an agreed upon transaction is found. Shares of the Dunkin' Brand have reportedly risen 33% in 2020 because of the possible Inspire Brands' deal.

On October 30, 2020, Dunkin' Brands announced that it was to be acquired by Inspire Brands in a transaction valued at $11.3 billion including the assumption of Dunkin' Brands debt. The deal closed on December 15, 2020.

Subsidiaries
 Baskin-Robbins
 Dunkin'
 Mister Donut

References

External links
 Official website (archived, 25 Apr 2020)

Food and drink companies of the United States
Fast-food chains of the United States
Holding companies of the United States
Restaurant groups in the United States
Companies based in Norfolk County, Massachusetts
Canton, Massachusetts
Holding companies established in 2004
American companies established in 2004
2011 initial public offerings
Companies formerly listed on the Nasdaq
2020 mergers and acquisitions
Inspire Brands
American companies disestablished in 2020